Jalilabad District may refer to:

 Jalilabad District (Azerbaijan)
 Jalilabad District (Iran)
 Jalilabad Rural District

District name disambiguation pages